Kunlunqiao Subdistrict is a Subdistrict in Xiangxiang City, Hunan Province, People's Republic of China.

Cityscape
The township is divided into five villages and seven communities, the following areas: Nanzhengjie Community, Kunlunqiao Community, Hutie Community, Nanjinlu Community, Xiangtanxianye Community, Ershisanzhiyigongsi Community, Hongxing Community, Xin'ao Village, Jiang'an Village, Yangjin Village, Lvnan Village, and Wuli Village (南正街社区、昆仑桥社区、湖铁社区、南津路社区、湘潭碱业社区、二十三冶一公司社区、红星社区、新坳村、江岸村、杨金村、铝南村、五里村).

References

External links

Divisions of Xiangxiang